Rade Vukotić (Cyrillic: Раде Вукотић; born 25 August 1982) is a Montenegrin retired football forward who last played for FK Jedinstvo Bijelo Polje.

Club career
Previously he has played with Serbian SuperLiga clubs OFK Beograd, FK Borac Čačak and FK Bežanija, Montenegrin clubs FK Jedinstvo Bijelo Polje and FK Grbalj and Slovenian club HIT Gorica.

External links
 Profile and stats at Srbijafudbal
 Season 2009-10 stats at 90minuta
 Profile at Jelenfootball

1982 births
Living people
People from Bijelo Polje
Association football forwards
Serbia and Montenegro footballers
Montenegrin footballers
FK Jedinstvo Bijelo Polje players
OFK Beograd players
ND Gorica players
FK Borac Čačak players
OFK Petrovac players
FK Bežanija players
First League of Serbia and Montenegro players
Second League of Serbia and Montenegro players
Montenegrin First League players
Serbian SuperLiga players
Serbia and Montenegro expatriate footballers
Expatriate footballers in Slovenia
Serbia and Montenegro expatriate sportspeople in Slovenia
Montenegrin expatriate footballers
Expatriate footballers in Serbia
Montenegrin expatriate sportspeople in Serbia